A special election was held in  on December 8, 1794, to fill a vacancy left by the resignation of Uriah Forrest (P) on November 8 of the same year.

Election results

Edwards took his seat in the 3rd Congress on January 2, 1795.

See also
List of special elections to the United States House of Representatives

References

Maryland 1794 03
Maryland 1794 03
1794 03
Maryland 03
United States House of Representatives
United States House of Representatives 1794 03